is the railway station in the town of Higashisonogi, Nagasaki Prefecture, Japan. It is operated by JR Kyushu and is on the Ōmura Line.

Lines
Besides the local services on the line, the Rapid Seaside Liner also stops at the station.

Station layout 
The station consists of two platforms serving two tracks. The station building is a steel frame structure of modern design and houses a waiting room and staffed ticket window. A ramp leads up to the station building from the forecourt. Access to the opposite site platform is by means of a level crossing with ramps at both ends.

Management of the station has been outsourced to the JR Kyushu Tetsudou Eigyou Co., a wholly owned subsidiary of JR Kyushu specialising in station services. It staffs the ticket window which is equipped with a POS machine but does not have a Midori no Madoguchi facility.

Adjacent stations

History
By 1897, the track had reached . In the next phase of expansion, the track was extended towards  which opened as the new terminus on 20 January 1898. Sonogi was opened on the same day as an intermediate station between Haiki and Ōmura. When the Kyushu Railway was nationalized on 1 July 1907, Japanese Government Railways (JGR) took over control of the station. On 12 October 1909, track from Tosu through Haiki to Nagasaki was designated the Nagasaki Main Line. With the privatization of Japanese National Railways (JNR), the successor of JGR, on 1 April 1987, control of the station passed to JR Kyushu.

Passenger statistics
In fiscal 2016, the station was used by an average of 345 passengers daily (boarding passengers only), and it ranked 288th  among the busiest stations of JR Kyushu.

Environs
JR Kyushu bus is operated for the Ureshino hot spring and Takeo-Onsen Station from the station square.

National Route 205
Sonogi Post Office
Higashisonogi Town Office

See also
 List of railway stations in Japan

References

External links
Sonogi Station (JR Kyushu)

Railway stations in Nagasaki Prefecture
Railway stations in Japan opened in 1898
Ōmura Line